Paul Thomas Deem (born August 16, 1957)) is a retired American track cyclist who set the 1974 national record for the 3 km Velodrome  in Encino, California. Deem won the gold medal for the 4 km team pursuit in the 1975 Pan American in Mexico City.  Deem finished the team pursuit in tenth place at the 1976 Summer Olympics in Montreal with Leonard Nitz, James Ochowicz, Ralph Therrio.

At the 1977 U.S. National Cycling Championships in Seattle, Washington, Deem won first place in the individual time trial, individual pursuit, team pursuit, and the 100 km time trial.  No one since Deem has won four first-place positions at one cycling competition.
Deem retired from competitive cycling in 1981 due to a progressive loss of muscle tissue caused by Charcot–Marie–Tooth disease. However, Deem continues coaching cyclists in Orange County, California.

Deem is owner of CycleWerks in Costa Mesa and San Clemente, California.

On August 27, 2013, Deem's wife, Debra Healy Deem, was hit by a motor vehicle when she was cycling on Pacific Coast Highway in Newport Beach, California.  She died from sustained injuries (blunt forced trauma to the brain) the following day.

References

External links 
Paul Deem: An Olympic Cyclist’s Triumph over Tragedy

Living people
1957 births
American male cyclists
Olympic cyclists of the United States
Cyclists at the 1976 Summer Olympics
American track cyclists
Pan American Games medalists in cycling
Pan American Games gold medalists for the United States
Medalists at the 1975 Pan American Games